Éva Allice (born 2 January 2002) is a footballer who plays as a defender for Division 3 Féminine club FC Nantes. Born in France, she represents Morocco at international level.

Club career 
Allice has played for Le Mans FC and Nantes in France.

International career
Allice made her senior debut for Morocco on 10 June 2021 in a 3–0 friendly home win over Mali.

See also
List of Morocco women's international footballers

References

External links 

2002 births
Living people
Citizens of Morocco through descent
Moroccan women's footballers
Women's association football defenders
Morocco women's international footballers
Sportspeople from Dreux
French women's footballers
Le Mans FC players
FC Nantes players
French sportspeople of Moroccan descent
Footballers from Centre-Val de Loire